Jagdfliegerführer Ostpreussen was initially part of 1st Fighter Division of the German Luftwaffe in World War II. It was formed 15 September 1943 in Neuhausen. On 8 September 1944 the Stab relocated to Königsberg-Seewiesen and subordinated to the Luftflotte 6 (Air Fleet 6) in January 1945. The Stab relocated again on 27 February 1945, this time to Treuenbrietzen. The unit was disbanded on 27 February 1945.

Commanding officers

Fliegerführer
Oberstleutnant Karl-Gottfried Nordmann, 1 April 1944
Hauptmann Egbert Belau, 1 October 1944

References
Notes

References
 Jagdfliegerführer Ostpreussen @ Lexikon der Wehrmacht
 Jagdfliegerführer Ostpreussen @ The Luftwaffe, 1933-45

Luftwaffe Fliegerführer
Military units and formations established in 1943
Military units and formations disestablished in 1944